NGC 302 is a magnitude 16.6 star located in the constellation Cetus. It was recorded in 1886 by Frank Muller.

References

0302
?
Cetus (constellation)